Social justice is justice in terms of the distribution of wealth, opportunities, and privileges within a society. In Western and Asian cultures, the concept of social justice has often referred to the process of ensuring that individuals fulfill their societal roles and receive their due from society. In the current movements for social justice, the emphasis has been on the breaking of barriers for social mobility, the creation of safety nets, and economic justice. Social justice assigns rights and duties in the institutions of society, which enables people to receive the basic benefits and burdens of cooperation. The relevant institutions often include taxation, social insurance, public health, public school, public services, labor law and regulation of markets, to ensure distribution of wealth, and equal opportunity.

Interpretations that relate justice to a reciprocal relationship to society are mediated by differences in cultural traditions, some of which emphasize the individual responsibility toward society and others the equilibrium between access to power and its responsible use. Hence, social justice is invoked today while reinterpreting historical figures such as Bartolomé de las Casas, in philosophical debates about differences among human beings, in efforts for gender, ethnic, and social equality, for advocating justice for migrants, prisoners, the environment, and the physically and developmentally disabled.

While concepts of social justice can be found in classical and Christian philosophical sources, from Plato and Aristotle to Augustine of Hippo and Thomas Aquinas, the term social justice finds its earliest uses in the late 18th century, albeit with unclear theoretical or practical meanings. The use of the term was early on subject to accusations of redundancy and of rhetorical flourish, perhaps but not necessarily related to amplifying one view of distributive justice. In the coining and definition of the term in the natural law social scientific treatise of Luigi Taparelli, in the early 1840s, Taparelli established the natural law principle that corresponded to the evangelical principle of brotherly love—i.e. social justice reflects the duty one has to one’s other self in the interdependent abstract unity of the human person in society. After the Revolutions of 1848, the term was popularized generically through the writings of Antonio Rosmini-Serbati.

In the late industrial revolution, Progressive Era American legal scholars began to use the term more, particularly Louis Brandeis and Roscoe Pound. From the early 20th century it was also embedded in international law and institutions; the preamble to establish the International Labour Organization recalled that "universal and lasting peace can be established only if it is based upon social justice." In the later 20th century, social justice was made central to the philosophy of the social contract, primarily by John Rawls in A Theory of Justice (1971). In 1993, the Vienna Declaration and Programme of Action treats social justice as a purpose of human rights education.

History 

The different concepts of justice, as discussed in ancient Western philosophy, were typically centered upon the community.

 Plato wrote in The Republic that it would be an ideal state that "every member of the community must be assigned to the class for which he finds himself best fitted." In an article for J.N.V University, author D.R. Bhandari says, "Justice is, for Plato, at once a part of human virtue and the bond, which joins man together in society. It is the identical quality that makes good and social. Justice is an order and duty of the parts of the soul, it is to the soul as health is to the body. Plato says that justice is not mere strength, but it is a harmonious strength. Justice is not the right of the stronger but the effective harmony of the whole. All moral conceptions revolve about the good of the whole-individual as well as social".
 Plato believed rights existed only between free people, and the law should take "account in the first instance of relations of inequality in which individuals are treated in proportion to their worth and only secondarily of relations of equality."  Reflecting this time when slavery and subjugation of women was typical, ancient views of justice tended to reflect the rigid class systems that still prevailed. On the other hand, for the privileged groups, strong concepts of fairness and the community existed. Distributive justice was said by Aristotle to require that people were distributed goods and assets according to their merit.

 Socrates (through Plato's dialogue Crito) is credited with developing the idea of a social contract, whereby people ought to follow the rules of a society, and accept its burdens because they have accepted its benefits. During the Middle Ages, religious scholars particularly, such as Thomas Aquinas continued discussion of justice in various ways, but ultimately connected being a good citizen to the purpose of serving God.

After the Renaissance and Reformation, the modern concept of social justice, as developing human potential, began to emerge through the work of a series of authors. Baruch Spinoza in On the Improvement of the Understanding (1677) contended that the one true aim of life should be to acquire "a human character much more stable than [one's] own", and to achieve this "pitch of perfection... The chief good is that he should arrive, together with other individuals if possible, at the possession of the aforesaid character." During the enlightenment and responding to the French and American Revolutions, Thomas Paine similarly wrote in The Rights of Man (1792) society should give "genius a fair and universal chance" and so "the construction of government ought to be such as to bring forward... all that extent of capacity which never fails to appear in revolutions."

Although there is no certainty about the first use of the term "social justice", early sources can be found in Europe in the 18th century. Some references to the use of the expression are in articles of journals aligned with the spirit of the Enlightenment, in which social justice is described as an obligation of the monarch; also the term is present in books written by Catholic Italian theologians, notably members of the Society of Jesus. Thus, according to this sources and the context, social justice was another term for "the justice of society", the justice that rules the relations among individuals in society, without any mention to socio-economic equity or human dignity.

The usage of the term started to become more frequent by Catholic thinkers from the 1840s, beginning with the Jesuit Luigi Taparelli in Civiltà Cattolica, and based on the work of St. Thomas Aquinas. Taparelli argued that rival capitalist and socialist theories, based on subjective Cartesian thinking, undermined the unity of society present in Thomistic metaphysics as neither were sufficiently concerned with ethics.  Writing in 1861, the influential British philosopher and economist, John Stuart Mill stated in Utilitarianism his view that "Society should treat all equally well who have deserved equally well of it, that is, who have deserved equally well absolutely. This is the highest abstract standard of social and distributive justice; towards which all institutions, and the efforts of all virtuous citizens, should be made in the utmost degree to converge."

In the later 19th and early 20th century, social justice became an important theme in American political and legal philosophy, particularly in the work of John Dewey, Roscoe Pound and Louis Brandeis. One of the prime concerns was the Lochner era decisions of the US Supreme Court to strike down legislation passed by state governments and the Federal government for social and economic improvement, such as the eight-hour day or the right to join a trade union. After the First World War, the founding document of the International Labour Organization took up the same terminology in its preamble, stating that "peace can be established only if it is based on social justice". From this point, the discussion of social justice entered into mainstream legal and academic discourse.

In 1931, the Pope Pius XI explicitly referred to the expression, along with the concept of subsidiarity, for the first time in Catholic social teaching in the encyclical Quadragesimo anno. Then again in Divini Redemptoris, the church pointed out that the realization of social justice relied on the promotion of the dignity of human person. During the 1930s, the term was widely associated with pro-Nazi and antisemitic groups, such as the Christian Front. Social Justice was the slogan of Charles Coughlin, and the name of his newspaper. Because of the documented influence of Divini Redemptoris in its drafters, the Constitution of Ireland was the first one to establish the term as a principle of the economy in the State, and then other countries around the world did the same throughout the 20th century, even in socialist regimes such as the Cuban Constitution in 1976.

In the late 20th century, several liberal and conservative thinkers, notably Friedrich Hayek rejected the concept by stating that it did not mean anything, or meant too many things. However the concept remained highly influential, particularly with its promotion by philosophers such as John Rawls. Even though the meaning of social justice varies, at least three common elements can be identified in the contemporary theories about it: a duty of the State to distribute certain vital means (such as economic, social, and cultural rights), the protection of human dignity, and affirmative actions to promote equal opportunities for everybody.

Contemporary theory

Philosophical perspectives

Cosmic values 

Hunter Lewis' work promoting natural healthcare and sustainable economies advocates for conservation as a key premise in social justice. His manifesto on sustainability ties the continued thriving of human life to real conditions, the environment supporting that life, and associates injustice with the detrimental effects of unintended consequences of human actions. Quoting classical Greek thinkers like Epicurus on the good of pursuing happiness, Hunter also cites ornithologist, naturalist, and philosopher Alexander Skutch in his book Moral Foundations:

Pope Benedict XVI cites Teilhard de Chardin in a vision of the cosmos as a 'living host' embracing an understanding of ecology that includes humanity's relationship to others, that pollution affects not just the natural world but interpersonal relations as well. Cosmic harmony, justice and peace are closely interrelated:

In The Quest for Cosmic Justice, Thomas Sowell writes that seeking utopia, while admirable, may have disastrous effects if done without strong consideration of the economic underpinnings that support contemporary society.

John Rawls 

Political philosopher John Rawls draws on the utilitarian insights of Bentham and Mill, the social contract ideas of John Locke, and the categorical imperative ideas of Kant. His first statement of principle was made in A Theory of Justice where he proposed that, "Each person possesses an inviolability founded on justice that even the welfare of society as a whole cannot override. For this reason justice denies that the loss of freedom for some is made right by a greater good shared by others." A deontological proposition that echoes Kant in framing the moral good of justice in absolutist terms. His views are definitively restated in Political Liberalism where society is seen "as a fair system of co-operation over time, from one generation to the next".

All societies have a basic structure of social, economic, and political institutions, both formal and informal. In testing how well these elements fit and work together, Rawls based a key test of legitimacy on the theories of social contract. To determine whether any particular system of collectively enforced social arrangements is legitimate, he argued that one must look for agreement by the people who are subject to it, but not necessarily to an objective notion of justice based on coherent ideological grounding. Obviously, not every citizen can be asked to participate in a poll to determine his or her consent to every proposal in which some degree of coercion is involved, so one has to assume that all citizens are reasonable. Rawls constructed an argument for a two-stage process to determine a citizen's hypothetical agreement:
 The citizen agrees to be represented by X for certain purposes, and, to that extent, X holds these powers as a trustee for the citizen.
 X agrees that enforcement in a particular social context is legitimate. The citizen, therefore, is bound by this decision because it is the function of the trustee to represent the citizen in this way.
This applies to one person who represents a small group (e.g., the organiser of a social event setting a dress code) as equally as it does to national governments, which are ultimate trustees, holding representative powers for the benefit of all citizens within their territorial boundaries. Governments that fail to provide for welfare of their citizens according to the principles of justice are not legitimate. To emphasise the general principle that justice should rise from the people and not be dictated by the law-making powers of governments, Rawls asserted that, "There is ... a general presumption against imposing legal and other restrictions on conduct without sufficient reason. But this presumption creates no special priority for any particular liberty." This is support for an unranked set of liberties that reasonable citizens in all states should respect and uphold — to some extent, the list proposed by Rawls matches the normative human rights that have international recognition and direct enforcement in some nation states where the citizens need encouragement to act in a way that fixes a greater degree of equality of outcome. According to Rawls, the basic liberties that every good society should guarantee are:
 Freedom of thought;
 Liberty of conscience as it affects social relationships on the grounds of religion, philosophy, and morality;
 Political liberties (e.g., representative democratic institutions, freedom of speech and the press, and freedom of assembly);
 Freedom of association;
 Freedoms necessary for the liberty and integrity of the person (namely: freedom from slavery, freedom of movement and a reasonable degree of freedom to choose one's occupation); and
 Rights and liberties covered by the rule of law.

Thomas Pogge 

Thomas Pogge's arguments pertain to a standard of social justice that creates human rights deficits. He assigns responsibility to those who actively cooperate in designing or imposing the social institution, that the order is foreseeable as harming the global poor and is reasonably avoidable.  Pogge argues that social institutions have a negative duty to not harm the poor.

Pogge speaks of "institutional cosmopolitanism" and assigns responsibility to institutional schemes for deficits of human rights.  An example given is slavery and third parties.  A third party should not recognize or enforce slavery.  The institutional order should be held responsible only for deprivations of human rights that it establishes or authorizes.  The current institutional design, he says, systematically harms developing economies by enabling corporate tax evasion, illicit financial flows, corruption, trafficking of people and weapons. Joshua Cohen disputes his claims based on the fact that some poor countries have done well with the current institutional design. Elizabeth Kahn argues that some of these responsibilities should apply globally.

United Nations 

The United Nations calls social justice "an underlying principle for peaceful and prosperous coexistence within and among nations.

The United Nations' 2006 document Social Justice in an Open World: The Role of the United Nations, states that "Social justice may be broadly understood as the fair and compassionate distribution of the fruits of economic growth..."

The term "social justice" was seen by the U.N. "as a substitute for the protection of human rights [and] first appeared in United Nations texts during the second half of the 1960s. At the initiative of the Soviet Union, and with the support of developing countries, the term was used in the Declaration on Social Progress and Development, adopted in 1969."

The same document reports, "From the comprehensive global perspective shaped by the United Nations Charter and the Universal Declaration of Human Rights, neglect of the pursuit of social justice in all its dimensions translates into de facto acceptance of a future marred by violence, repression and chaos." The report concludes, "Social justice is not possible without strong and coherent redistributive policies conceived and implemented by public agencies."

The same UN document offers a concise history: "[T]he notion of social justice is relatively new. None of history’s great philosophers—not Plato or Aristotle, or Confucius or Averroes, or even Rousseau or Kant—saw the need to consider justice or the redress of injustices from a social perspective. The concept first surfaced in Western thought and political language in the wake of the industrial revolution and the parallel development of the socialist doctrine. It emerged as an expression of protest against what was perceived as the capitalist exploitation of labor and as a focal point for the development of measures to improve the human condition. It was born as a revolutionary slogan embodying the ideals of progress and fraternity. Following the revolutions that shook Europe in the mid-1800s, social justice became a rallying cry for progressive thinkers and political activists.... By the mid-twentieth century, the concept of social justice had become central to the ideologies and programs of virtually all the leftist and centrist political parties around the world..."

Another key area of human rights and social justice is the United Nations's defense of children's rights worldwide. In 1989, the Convention on the Rights of the Child was adopted and available for signature, ratification and accession by General Assembly resolution 44/25. According to OHCHR, this convention entered into force on 2 September 1990. This convention upholds that all states have the obligation to "protect the child from all forms of physical or mental violence, injury or abuse, neglect or negligent treatment, maltreatment or exploitation, including sexual abuse."

Religious perspectives

Abrahamic religions

Christianity

Evangelicalism 
Time magazine noted that younger Evangelicals also increasingly engage in social justice. John Stott traced the call for social justice back to the cross, "The cross is a revelation of God's justice as well as of his love. That is why the community of the cross should concern itself with social justice as well as with loving philanthropy."

Methodism 
From its founding, Methodism was a Christian social justice movement. Under John Wesley's direction, Methodists became leaders in many social justice issues of the day, including the prison reform and abolition movements. Wesley himself was among the first to preach for slaves rights, attracting significant opposition.

Today, social justice plays a major role in the United Methodist Church and the Free Methodist Church. The Book of Discipline of the United Methodist Church says, "We hold governments responsible for the protection of the rights of the people to free and fair elections and to the freedoms of speech, religion, assembly, communications media, and petition for redress of grievances without fear of reprisal; to the right to privacy; and to the guarantee of the rights to adequate food, clothing, shelter, education, and health care." The United Methodist Church also teaches population control as part of its doctrine.

Catholicism 

Catholic social teaching consists of those aspects of Roman Catholic doctrine which relate to matters dealing with the respect of the individual human life. A distinctive feature of Catholic social doctrine is its concern for the poorest and most vulnerable members of society. Two of the seven key areas of "Catholic social teaching" are pertinent to social justice:
 Life and dignity of the human person: The foundational principle of all Catholic social teaching is the sanctity of all human life and the inherent dignity of every human person, from conception to natural death. Human life must be valued above all material possessions.
 Preferential option for the poor and vulnerable: Catholics believe Jesus taught that on the Day of Judgement God will ask what each person did to help the poor and needy: "Amen, I say to you, whatever you did for one of these least brothers of mine, you did for me." The Catholic Church believes that through words, prayers and deeds one must show solidarity with, and compassion for, the poor. The moral test of any society is "how it treats its most vulnerable members. The poor have the most urgent moral claim on the conscience of the nation. People are called to look at public policy decisions in terms of how they affect the poor."

Modern Catholic social teaching is often thought to have begun with the encyclicals of Pope Leo XIII.
 Pope Leo XIII, who studied under Taparelli, published in 1891 the encyclical Rerum novarum (On the Condition of the Working Classes; lit. "On new things"), rejecting both socialism and capitalism, while defending labor unions and private property. He stated that society should be based on cooperation and not class conflict and competition. In this document, Leo set out the Catholic Church's response to the social instability and labor conflict that had arisen in the wake of industrialization and had led to the rise of socialism. The Pope advocated that the role of the state was to promote social justice through the protection of rights, while the church must speak out on social issues to teach correct social principles and ensure class harmony.
 The encyclical Quadragesimo anno (On Reconstruction of the Social Order, literally "in the fortieth year") of 1931 by Pope Pius XI, encourages a living wage, subsidiarity, and advocates that social justice is a personal virtue as well as an attribute of the social order, saying that society can be just only if individuals and institutions are just.
 Pope John Paul II added much to the corpus of the Catholic social teaching, penning three encyclicals which focus on issues such as economics, politics, geo-political situations, ownership of the means of production, private property and the "social mortgage", and private property. The encyclicals Laborem exercens, Sollicitudo rei socialis, and Centesimus annus are just a small portion of his overall contribution to Catholic social justice. Pope John Paul II was a strong advocate of justice and human rights, and spoke forcefully for the poor. He addresses issues such as the problems that technology can present should it be misused, and admits a fear that the "progress" of the world is not true progress at all, if it should denigrate the value of the human person. He argued in Centesimus annus that private property, markets, and honest labor were the keys to alleviating the miseries of the poor and to enabling a life that can express the fullness of the human person.
 Pope Benedict XVI's encyclical Deus caritas est ("God is Love") of 2006 claims that justice is the defining concern of the state and the central concern of politics, and not of the church, which has charity as its central social concern. It said that the laity has the specific responsibility of pursuing social justice in civil society and that the church's active role in social justice should be to inform the debate, using reason and natural law, and also by providing moral and spiritual formation for those involved in politics.
 The official Catholic doctrine on social justice can be found in the book Compendium of the Social Doctrine of the Church, published in 2004 and updated in 2006, by the Pontifical Council Iustitia et Pax.

The Catechism of the Catholic Church (§§ 1928–1948) contains more detail of the church's view of social justice.

Islam 

In Muslim history, Islamic governance has often been associated with social justice. Establishment of social justice was one of the motivating factors of the Abbasid revolt against the Umayyads. The Shi'a believe that the return of the Mahdi will herald in "the messianic age of justice" and the Mahdi along with the Isa (Jesus) will end plunder, torture, oppression and discrimination.

For the Muslim Brotherhood the implementation of social justice would require the rejection of consumerism and communism. The Brotherhood strongly affirmed the right to private property as well as differences in personal wealth due to factors such as hard work. However, the Brotherhood held Muslims had an obligation to assist those Muslims in need. It held that zakat (alms-giving) was not voluntary charity, but rather the poor had the right to assistance from the more fortunate. Most Islamic governments therefore enforce the zakat through taxes.

Judaism 

In To Heal a Fractured World: The Ethics of Responsibility, Rabbi Jonathan Sacks states that social justice has a central place in Judaism. One of Judaism's most distinctive and challenging ideas is its ethics of responsibility reflected in the concepts of simcha ("gladness" or "joy"), tzedakah ("the religious obligation to perform charity and philanthropic acts"), chesed ("deeds of kindness"), and tikkun olam ("repairing the world").

Eastern religions

Hinduism 

The present-day Jāti hierarchy is undergoing changes for a variety of reasons including 'social justice', which is a politically popular stance in democratic India. Institutionalized affirmative action has promoted this. The disparity and wide inequalities in social behaviour of the jātis – exclusive, endogamous communities centred on traditional occupations – has led to various reform movements in Hinduism. While legally outlawed, the caste system remains strong in practice.

Traditional Chinese religion 

The Chinese concept of Tian Ming has occasionally been perceived as an expression of social justice. Through it, the deposition of unfair rulers is justified in that civic dissatisfaction and economical disasters is perceived as Heaven withdrawing its favor from the Emperor. A successful rebellion is considered definite proof that the Emperor is unfit to rule.

Social justice movements 

Social justice is also a concept that is used to describe the movement towards a socially just world, e.g., the Global Justice Movement. In this context, social justice is based on the concepts of human rights and equality, and can be defined as "the way in which human rights are manifested in the everyday lives of people at every level of society".

Several movements are working to achieve social justice in society. These movements are working toward the realization of a world where all members of a society, regardless of background or procedural justice, have basic human rights and equal access to the benefits of their society.

Liberation theology 

Liberation theology is a movement in Christian theology which conveys the teachings of Jesus Christ in terms of a liberation from unjust economic, political, or social conditions. It has been described by proponents as "an interpretation of Christian faith through the poor's suffering, their struggle and hope, and a critique of society and the Catholic faith and Christianity through the eyes of the poor", and by detractors as Christianity perverted by Marxism and Communism.

Although liberation theology has grown into an international and inter-denominational movement, it began as a movement within the Catholic Church in Latin America in the 1950s–1960s. It arose principally as a moral reaction to the poverty caused by social injustice in that region. It achieved prominence in the 1970s and 1980s. The term was coined by the Peruvian priest Gustavo Gutiérrez, who wrote one of the movement's most famous books, A Theology of Liberation (1971). According to Sarah Kleeb, "Marx would surely take issue," she writes, "with the appropriation of his works in a religious context...there is no way to reconcile Marx's views of religion with those of Gutierrez, they are simply incompatible. Despite this, in terms of their understanding of the necessity of a just and righteous world, and the nearly inevitable obstructions along such a path, the two have much in common; and, particularly in the first edition of [A Theology of Liberation], the use of Marxian theory is quite evident."

Other noted exponents are Leonardo Boff of Brazil, Carlos Mugica of Argentina, Jon Sobrino of El Salvador, and Juan Luis Segundo of Uruguay.

Health care 

Social justice has more recently made its way into the field of bioethics. Discussion involves topics such as affordable access to health care, especially for low-income households and families. The discussion also raises questions such as whether society should bear healthcare costs for low-income families, and whether the global marketplace is the best way to distribute healthcare. Ruth Faden of the Johns Hopkins Berman Institute of Bioethics and Madison Powers of Georgetown University focus their analysis of social justice on which inequalities matter the most. They develop a social justice theory that answers some of these questions in concrete settings.

Social injustices occur when there is a preventable difference in health states among a population of people. These social injustices take the form of health inequities when negative health states such as malnourishment, and infectious diseases are more prevalent in impoverished nations. These negative health states can often be prevented by providing social and economic structures such as primary healthcare which ensures the general population has equal access to health care services regardless of income level, gender, education or any other stratifying factors. Integrating social justice with health inherently reflects the social determinants of health model without discounting the role of the bio-medical model.

Health inequalities 
The sources of health inequalities are rooted in injustices associated with racism, sex discrimination, and social class. Richard Hofrichter and his colleagues examine the political implications of various perspectives used to explain health inequities and explore alternative strategies for eliminating them.

Human rights education 

The Vienna Declaration and Programme of Action affirm that "Human rights education should include peace, democracy, development and social justice, as set forth in international and regional human rights instruments, to achieve common understanding and awareness to strengthen universal commitment to human rights."

Ecology and environment 

Social justice principles are embedded in the larger environmental movement. The third principle of the Earth Charter is social and economic justice, which is described as seeking to eradicate poverty as an ethical, social, and environmental imperative, ensure that economic activities and institutions at all levels promote human development in an equitable and sustainable manner, affirm gender equality and equity as prerequisites to sustainable development and ensure universal access to education, health care, and economic opportunity, and uphold the right of all, without discrimination, to a natural and social environment supportive of human dignity, bodily health, and spiritual well-being, with special attention to the rights of indigenous peoples and minorities.

The climate justice and environmental justice movements also incorporate social justice principles, ideas, and practices. Climate justice and environmental justice, as movements within the larger ecological and environmental movement, each incorporate social justice in a particular way. Climate justice includes concern for social justice pertaining to greenhouse gas emissions, climate-induced environmental displacement, as well as climate change mitigation and adaptation. Environmental justice includes concern for social justice pertaining to either environmental benefits or environmental pollution based on their equitable distribution across communities of color, communities of various socio and economic stratification, or any other barriers to justice.

Criticism 

Michael Novak argues that social justice has seldom been adequately defined, arguing:

Friedrich Hayek of the Austrian School of economics rejected the very idea of social justice as meaningless, self-contradictory, and ideological, believing that to realize any degree of social justice is unfeasible, and that the attempt to do so must destroy all liberty:

Hayek argued that proponents of social justice often present it as a moral virtue but most of their descriptions pertain to impersonal states of affairs (e.g. income inequality, poverty), which are cited as "social injustice." Hayek argued that social justice is either a virtue or it is not. If it is, it can only be ascribed to the actions of individuals. However, most who use the term ascribe it to social systems, so "social justice" in fact describes a regulative principle of order; they are interested not in virtue but power. For Hayek, this notion of social justices presupposes that people are guided by specific external directions rather than internal, personal rules of just conduct. It further presupposes that one can never be held accountable for ones own behaviour, as this would be "blaming the victim." According to Hayek, the function of social justice is to blame someone else, often attributed to "the system" or those who are supposed, mythically, to control it. Thus it is based on the appealing idea of "you suffer; your suffering is caused by powerful others; these oppressors must be destroyed."

Ben O'Neill of the University of New South Wales and the Mises Institute argues:

See also 

  Activism
 "Beyond Vietnam: A Time to Break Silence", one of many pro–social justice speeches delivered by Martin Luther King Jr.
 Choosing the Common Good
 Counterculture of the 1960s
 Economic justice
 Education for Justice
 Environmental racism
 Essentially contested concept
 Global justice
 Labour law and labour rights
 Left-wing politics
 Resource justice
 Right to education
 Right to health
 Right to housing
 Right to social security
 Social justice art
 Social justice warrior
 Social law
 Social work
 Solidarity
 National Union for Social Justice (organization)
 World Day of Social Justice

References

Further reading

Articles 
 C Pérez-Garzón, 'What is social justice? A new history of its meaning in the transnational legal discourse' (2019) 43 Revista Derecho del Estado 67-106, originally in Spanish: '¿Qué es justicia social? Una nueva historia de su significado en el discurso jurídico transnacional'
 LD Brandeis, 'The Living Law' (1915–1916) 10 Illinois Law Review 461
 A Etzioni, 'The Fair Society, Uniting America: Restoring the Vital Center to American Democracy ' in N Garfinkle and D Yankelovich (eds) (Yale University Press 2005) pp. 211–223
 Otto von Gierke, The Social Role of Private Law (2016) translated and introduced by E McGaughey, originally in German Die soziale Aufgabe des Privatrechts
 M Novak, 'Defining Social Justice' (2000) First Things
 B O'Neill, 'The Injustice of Social Justice' (Mises Institute)
 R Pound, 'Social Justice and Legal Justice' (1912) 75 Central Law Journal 455
 M Powers and R Faden, 'Inequalities in health, inequalities in health care: four generations of discussion about justice and cost-effectiveness analysis' (2000) 10(2) Kennedy Inst Ethics Journal 109–127
 M Powers and R Faden, 'Racial and Ethnic Disparities in Health Care: An Ethical Analysis of When and How They Matter,' in Unequal Treatment: Confronting Racial and Ethnic Disparities in Health Care (National Academy of Sciences, Institute of Medicine, 2002) 722–38
 United Nations, Department of Economic and Social Affairs, 'Social Justice in an Open World: The Role of the United Nations' (2006) ST/ESA/305

Books 
 AB Atkinson, Social Justice and Public Policy (1982) previews
 Gad Barzilai, Communities and Law: Politics and Cultures of Legal Identities (University of Michigan Press) analysis of justice for non-ruling communities
 TN Carver, Essays in Social Justice (1915) Chapter  links.
 C Quigley The Evolution of Civilizations: An Introduction to Historical Analysis (1961) 2nd edition 1979
 P Corning, The Fair Society: The Science of Human Nature and the Pursuit of Social Justice (Chicago UP 2011)
 WL Droel What is Social Justice (ACTA Publications 2011)
 R Faden and M Powers, Social Justice: The Moral Foundations of Public Health and Health Policy OUP 2006 
 J Franklin (ed), Life to the Full: Rights and Social Justice in Australia (Connor Court 2007)
 LC Frederking (2013) Reconstructing Social Justice (Routledge) 
 FA Hayek, Law, Legislation and Liberty (1973) vol II, ch 3
 G Kitching, Seeking Social Justice through Globalization: Escaping a Nationalist Perspective (2003)
 JS Mill, Utilitarianism (1863)
 T Massaro, S.J. Living Justice: Catholic Social Teaching in Action (Rowman & Littlefield 2012)
 John Rawls, A Theory of Justice (Harvard University Press 1971)
 John Rawls, Political Liberalism (Columbia University Press 1993)
 C Philomena, B Hoose and G Mannion (eds), Social Justice: Theological and Practical Explorations (2007)
 A Swift, Political Philosophy (3rd edn 2013) ch 1
 Michael J. Thompson, The Limits of Liberalism: A Republican Theory of Social Justice (International Journal of Ethics: vol. 7, no. 3 (2011)

 
Justice
Social inequality
Social work
Liberalism
Left-wing politics 
Progressivism